Thiemo de Bakker was the defending champion but chose not to defend his title.

Ernesto Escobedo won the title after defeating Denis Kudla 6–4, 6–4 in the final.

Seeds

Draw

Finals

Top half

Bottom half

References
Main Draw
Qualifying Draw

Monterrey Challenger - Singles